A godet ( or ) is an extra piece of fabric in the shape of a circular sector which is set into a garment, usually a dress or skirt. The addition of a godet causes the article of clothing in question to flare, thus adding width and volume. The most popular use of godets is in petticoats.  Adding a godet to a piece of clothing also gives the wearer a wider range of motion.

See also
Gore (fabrics)
Gusset
Pleat

References

Sewing
Clothing